The aldo-keto reductase family is a family of proteins that are subdivided into 16 categories; these include a number of related monomeric NADPH-dependent oxidoreductases, such as aldehyde reductase, aldose reductase, prostaglandin F synthase, xylose reductase, rho crystallin, and many others.

Structure 

All possess a similar structure, with a beta-alpha-beta fold characteristic of nucleotide binding proteins. The fold comprises a parallel beta-8/alpha-8-barrel, which contains a novel NADP-binding motif. The binding site is located in a large, deep, elliptical pocket in the C-terminal end of the beta sheet, the substrate being bound in an extended conformation. The hydrophobic nature of the pocket favours aromatic and apolar substrates over highly polar ones.

Binding of the NADPH coenzyme causes a massive conformational change, reorienting a loop, effectively locking the coenzyme in place. This binding is more similar to FAD- than to NAD(P)-binding oxidoreductases.

Examples
Some proteins of this family contain a potassium channel beta chain regulatory domain; these are reported to have oxidoreductase activity.

See also
 AKR1
 Steroidogenic enzyme

References

Protein domains
Protein families
EC 1.1